Marie Hampton Joseph (née Downs, 21 May 1920 – 28 December 1996) was a British writer of short-stories in magazines, 16 romance novels and a book about her arthritis. In 1987, her novel A Better World Than won the Romantic Novel of the Year Award by the Romantic Novelists' Association.

Biography

Personal life
Joseph was born in Blackburn, Lancashire, England in May 1920 and was educated at Blackburn High School for Girls. She was in the Civil Service, before her marriage with a chartered Engineer. They had two daughters, now married, and eight grandchildren. She lived in Middlesex with her retired husband.

Career
She started to write at the age of 40, and she managed to publish in journals during the 1960s and 1970s, the stories are reedited in collection in the 1990s. Joseph published her first long romance novel in 1975. In 1976, she wrote a book about her life with arthritis. She continued publishing romance novels until 1992 and died in Harrow, London in December 1996 at the age of 76.

Bibliography

Single novels
 The Guilty Party (1975)
 One Step at a Time (1976)
 Ring-a-roses (1979)
 Maggie Craig (1980)
 A Leaf in the Wind (1980)
 Emma Sparrow (1981)
 Gemini Girls (1982)
 The Listening Silence (1983)
 Lisa Logan (1984)
 Polly Pilgrim (1984)
 The Clogger's Child (1985) aka Prelude (US title)
 The Travelling Man (1989)
 Since He Went Away (1992)

Daisy's World
 A Better World Than This (1986)
 A World Apart (1988)

Collections of short stories
 Passing Strangers and Other Stories (1987)
 When Love Was Like That: A Collection of Short Stories (1991)
 The Way We Were: A Collection of Short Stories (1994)
 A Time to Remember: A Collection of Short Stories (1997)

Non-fiction
 Footsteps in the Park (1976)

References and sources

1920 births
1996 deaths
20th-century English women writers
20th-century English novelists
English romantic fiction writers
English women novelists
People from Blackburn
RoNA Award winners
Women romantic fiction writers
Writers from Lancashire